Antimilos is a Greek island in the Cyclades,  northwest of Milos. Administratively, it is part of the municipality of Milos. Antimilos is an uninhabited mass of trachyte (671 m height), often called Erimomilos (Desert Milos). It is a volcanic island and the crater is still obvious. Ancient inhabitants transformed the crater to an open rain tank. On the island lives a rare variation of the common goat called Capra aegagrus pictus. It is similar but not the same as the Cretan goat known as "kri-kri" (Capra aegagrus creticus).

History
According to an interpretation of Homer's Odyssey, it is the island of the sun god Helios, where Odysseus's companions slaughtered the sacred cattle of the sun god. Previously, the island was also known by the name Ephyra or Ephora (Έφορα, meaning "watchtower"), because one could observe the sea from its highest point over long distances.

Settlement in prehistoric times can be assumed due to remains of walls and arrowheads made of obsidian found on the island. Remains of a cistern probably of Roman or early Christian origin have also been found.

References

External links
Official website of Municipality of Mílos 

Islands of Greece
Cyclades
Landforms of Milos (regional unit)
Islands of the South Aegean
Uninhabited islands of Greece
Subduction volcanoes
Volcanoes of Greece
Volcanoes of the Aegean